Potawatomi Wildlife Park in Tippecanoe, Indiana, is a privately owned and managed nature sanctuary.

External links
https://potawatomiwildlifepark.com/

Nature reserves in Indiana
Protected areas of Marshall County, Indiana